The IFA H6 is a 6.5 tonne lorry, made by East German manufacturer VEB Kraftfahrzeugwerk »Ernst Grube« Werdau. It was available in long wheelbase lorry (H6), and short wheelbase tractor (H6Z) versions. Approxiamtely 7,500 were built from 1952 to 1959. The bus IFA H6B was based upon IFA H6 components. For political reasons, there were no successors to the H6. Such had been developed, but production of the smaller IFA S 4000-1 commenced at IFA's Werdau plant instead.

Technical description 

The IFA H6 is a lorry (or tractor), based upon a conventional U-profile ladder frame. It has leaf sprung rigid front and rear axles, with the rear being a live axle. All wheels come with pneumatically operated drum brakes, and 12—20 inch tyres; the rear tyres are twin tyres. A dry single-disc clutch transmits the torque from the engine to an unsynchronised five-speed gearbox with reverse gear. The H6 is powered by an IFA EMaW 6—20 engine. The IFA H6 can reach a top speed of 54 km/h.

References

External links 

IFA vehicles
Vehicles introduced in 1951